Timarcha goettingensis, commonly known as the Small Bloody-nosed Beetle or the Lesser Bloody-nosed Beetle is a species of leaf beetle native to Europe.

Description
T. goettingensis is a shiny blue-black, violet-copper, or black beetle measuring 8–13 mm in length. Visually it may be confused with Timarcha tenebricosa, but this beetle is larger (11–18 mm) and is more constricted on the base of its pronotum than T. goettingensis. Timarcha goettingensis may also be visually confused with Chrysolina sturmi.

References

External links
Images representing Timarcha at BOLD

Chrysomelinae
Beetles described in 1758
Taxa named by Carl Linnaeus
Beetles of Europe
Wingless beetles